Thunder City was an aircraft operating and maintenance company based at the Cape Town International Airport in Cape Town, South Africa. It was well known for owning the largest civilian collection of former military jet aircraft in the world. These aircraft were used to perform in airshows and could also be chartered by the general public for recreational flights, including going supersonic and climbing to altitudes around 50,000 feet. Following a fatal accident in 2009 in which an English Electric Lightning crashed at an airshow, the company ceased flying operations after the accident investigation found major shortcomings in its maintenance programme.

The company's other activities included upgrading older models of the Aerospatiale Puma helicopter with modern avionics and renovating airframes and engines.

Company structure
Thunder City Holdings (Pty) Ltd. is the parent company of several subsidiaries:
 Thunder City Aircraft Company
 Thunder City Aircraft Maintenance Company
 Thunder City Education
 Thunder City Aircraft Entertainment
 Thunder City Flying Company
 Thunder City Property Company

Fleet
Some of the aircraft are the most recently airworthy examples of the type.
 Three  English Electric Lightning. One T5 was lost in an accident on 14 November 2009.
 Three Blackburn Buccaneers.
 Seven Hawker Hunters.
 One Aerospatiale Puma, a demonstrator of the company's upgrade and refurbishment services.
 One Gloster Javelin FAW Mk.1 (RAF No. XA553). Mounted as a "Gate Guard" on display at the entrance to the company premises.

In October 2012, three Lightnings, three Buccaneers and four Hawker Hunters were put up for sale.

AAD 2008 controversy
During a display flight at the 2008 African Aerospace and Defence (AAD) show in Cape Town a pair of Thunder City Lightnings flew close to the city at supersonic speed. Only the higher one of the pair was planned to fly supersonic as it was considered to be high enough so as not to cause alarm, however the lower aircraft also broke the sound barrier. The resulting sonic boom brought many complaints from the public.

2009 Lightning crash
An English Electric Lightning T5, ZU-BEX, (RAF No. XS451) crashed while carrying out a display at the biennial South African Air Force Overberg Airshow held at AFB Overberg near Bredasdorp on 14 November 2009. The aircraft suffered hydraulic failure after a fire started in the rear of the fuselage. The pilot was killed because his ejection seat failed to operate due to the canopy not jettisoning.

The accident investigation found major shortcomings in the maintenance program of the aircraft, consequently the South African Civil Aviation Authority suspended the company's operating certificate in March 2010.  On 9 September 2010, it was reported that the Thunder City fleet would no longer take paying passengers.

On 22 August 2011 three Lightnings, three Buccaneers and four Hunters were listed as "for sale by private treaty" with Go Industry. The closing date for bids was 27 April 2012. The first time Thunder City participated in an airshow since the 2009 crash was on 21 April 2012 at the AFB Overberg airshow.

A set of Lightning tyres were sold by Thunder City to the Bloodhound SSC Project in August 2012.

Death of Mike Beachy Head and sale of the remaining collection

Mike Beachy Head, the owner of Thunder City, died suddenly of a heart attack at the age of 59 on 21st May 2017. The remaining aircraft collection was subsequently moved outdoors by the Landlord of the Thunder City Hangar in Cape Town.

At the end of 2021, Jay Smith, an ex oil entrepreneur with a passion for fast jets and head of South African aircraft maintenance company Hangar 51, bought the remains of the Thunder City collection from Mike Beachy Head's estate. Various aircraft from the collection have since been moved and are undergoing restoration.

Notes

References

Aviation in South Africa
Companies established in 1998
Aerospace companies of South Africa
Companies based in Cape Town
Defunct companies of South Africa